Apsilocephalidae is a family of flies in the superfamily Asiloidea. It was historically treated as a subfamily within Therevidae, but placed in a separate family in 1991, and subsequently recognized as more distantly related. The family contains three extant genera and at least five extinct genera described from the fossil record.

Genera
These six genera belong to the family Apsilocephalidae:
 Apsilocephala Kröber, 1914
 †Burmapsilocephala Gaimari & Mostovski, 2000 (Cenomanian, Burmese amber)
 Clesthentia White, 1915
 Clesthentiella Nagatomi, Saigusa, Nagatomi & Lyneborg, 1991
 †Irwinimyia Zhang et al., 2018 (Cenomanian, Burmese amber)
 †Kaurimyia Winterton & Irwin, 2008
 †Kumaromyia Grimaldi & Hauser, 2011
 †Myanmarpsilocephala Zhang et al., 2018 (Cenomanian, Burmese amber)

The Burmese amber genus Kuhwahldyia described in 2019 is suggested to be a relative of the family.

Therevoid clade

References

Nagatomi, A.; Saigusa, Toyohei; Nagatomi, Hisako & Lyneborg, L. (1991): Apsilocephalidae, a new family of orthorrhaphous Brachycera (Insecta, Diptera). Zoological Science (Tokyo) 8(3): 579-591.
Nagatomi, A.; Saigusa, T.; Nagatomi, H. & Lyneborg, L.. 1991. The systematic position of the Apsilocephalidae, Rhagionempididae, Protempididae, Hilarimorphidae, Vermileonidae and some genera of Bombyliidae (Insecta, Diptera). Zool. Science 8:593-607.
The genitalia of the Apsilocephalidae (Diptera). Japanese Journal of Entomology. 59. 409-423.

External links

TOL

Brachycera families
Asiloidea